Geum molle is a species of flowering plant of the genus Geum (avens) in the family Rosaceae. A perennial herbaceous plant found on meadows, it is native to the mountains of the Balkan Peninsula and Italy. It blooms with yellow flowers between June and August.

Distribution 
The plant is found in several of the mountains of southern Bosnia and Herzegovina, Montenegro, Kosovo (the Prokletije mountain range), northernmost Greece, eastern and northern Albania, the west and north of the Republic of Northern Macedonia, and western Bulgaria (at elevations of 1000–1800m in central and western Stara Planina, Vitosha Kraishte, Osogovo, Rila, Pirin and the western Rhodopes).

Hybrids 
The hybrid Geum molle × Geum rivale, sometimes known as Geum pseudomolle , is found in eastern Montenegro's Crna Planina, western Bulgaria's Vitosha, and probably elsewhere. Geum molle × Geum coccineum has been noted in Vitosha.

References 

molle